is a 1954 Japanese film directed by Seiji Hisamatsu based on the short story collection  by the Japanese woman writer Sakae Tsuboi. It was entered into the 1955 Cannes Film Festival.

Cast
 Kinuyo Tanaka as Michi Saeki
 Yōko Sugi as Kuniko Hyūga
 Kyōko Kagawa as Mie Hyūga
 Hisao Toake as Manzō Saeki
 Masao Mishima as Sakutarō Sugie
 Yukiko Todoroki as Takako Takagi
 Gen Funabashi as Kyōhei Ishida
 Eiko Miyoshi as Ofuku
 Ranko Hanai as Kayano Sugie
 Toshio Hosokawa as Aoshima

References

External links

1954 films
1950s Japanese-language films
Japanese black-and-white films
Films directed by Seiji Hisamatsu
Films scored by Ichirō Saitō
Japanese drama films
1954 drama films
1950s Japanese films